Stokes shift is the difference (in energy, wavenumber or frequency units) between positions of the band maxima of the absorption and emission spectra (fluorescence and Raman being two examples) of the same electronic transition. It is named after Irish physicist George Gabriel Stokes. Sometimes Stokes shifts are given in wavelength units, but this is less meaningful than energy, wavenumber or frequency units because it depends on the absorption wavelength. For instance, a 50 nm Stokes shift from absorption at 300 nm is larger in terms of energy than a 50 nm Stokes shift from absorption at 600 nm.

When a system (be it a molecule or atom) absorbs a photon, it gains energy and enters an excited state. One way for the system to relax is to emit a photon, thus losing its energy (another method would be the loss of energy as translational mode energy (via vibrational-translational or electronic-translational collisional processes with other atoms or molecules)). When the emitted photon has less energy than the absorbed photon, this energy difference is the Stokes shift.

The Stokes shift is primarily the result of two phenomena: vibrational relaxation or dissipation and solvent reorganization. A fluorophore is a dipole, surrounded by solvent molecules. When a fluorophore enters an excited state, its dipole moment changes, but surrounding solvent molecules cannot adjust so quickly. Only after vibrational relaxation do their dipole moments realign.

Stokes fluorescence

Stokes fluorescence is the emission of a longer-wavelength photon (lower frequency or energy) by a molecule that has absorbed a photon of shorter wavelength (higher frequency or energy). Both absorption and radiation (emission) of energy are distinctive for a particular molecular structure. If a material has a direct bandgap in the range of visible light, the light shining on it is absorbed, which excites electrons to a higher-energy state. The electrons remain in the excited state for about 10−8 seconds. This number varies over several orders of magnitude, depending on the sample, and is known as the fluorescence lifetime of the sample. After losing a small amount of energy through vibrational relaxation, the molecule returns to the ground state, and energy is emitted. In direct-bandgap thin-film semiconducting layers Stokes shifted emission can originate from three main sources: doping, strain, and disorder.

Anti-Stokes shift 
If the emitted photon has more energy than the absorbed photon, the energy difference is called an anti-Stokes shift; this extra energy comes from dissipation of thermal phonons in a crystal lattice, cooling the crystal in the process. Yttrium oxysulfide doped with gadolinium oxysulfide is a common industrial anti-Stokes pigment, absorbing in the near-infrared and emitting in the visible region of the spectrum. Photon upconversion is another anti-Stokes process. An example of this later process is demonstrated by upconverting nanoparticles. It is more commonly observed in Raman spectroscopy, where it can be used to determine the temperature of a material.

See also
 Jablonski diagram
 Kasha's rule

References

Fluorescence
Raman spectroscopy